A chuckwagon is a type of field kitchen covered wagon historically used for the storage and transportation of food and cooking equipment on the prairies of the United States and Canada. Such wagons formed part of a wagon train of settlers or fed traveling workers such as cowboys or loggers.

In modern times, chuckwagons feature in certain cooking competitions and events. Chuckwagons are also used in a type of horse racing known as chuckwagon racing.

History

While some form of mobile kitchens had existed for generations, the invention of the chuckwagon is attributed to Charles Goodnight, a Texas rancher known as the "father of the Texas Panhandle," who introduced the concept in 1866.After the American Civil War, the beef market in Texas expanded. Some cattlemen herded cattle in parts of the country that did not have railroads, requiring them to be fed on the road for months at a time. Goodnight modified a Studebaker-manufactured covered wagon, a durable Civil War army-surplus wagon, to suit the needs of cowboys driving cattle from Texas to sell in New Mexico. He added a "chuck box" to the back of the wagon, with drawers and shelves for storage space and a hinged lid to provide a flat working surface. A water barrel was also attached to the wagon and canvas was hung underneath to carry firewood.  A wagon box was used to store cooking supplies and cowboys' personal items.

Chuckwagon food typically included easy-to-preserve items such as beans, salted meats, coffee, and sourdough biscuits. Food would also be gathered en route. There was no fresh fruit, vegetables, or eggs available, and meat was not fresh unless an animal was injured during the run and therefore had to be killed. The meat they ate was greasy cloth-wrapped bacon, salt pork, and beef, usually dried, salted or smoked.  On cattle drives, it was common for the "cookie" who ran the wagon to be second in authority only to the "trailboss." The cookie would often act as cook, barber, dentist, and banker.

Cook-offs

 
The American Chuckwagon Association is an organization dedicated to the preservation of the heritage of the chuckwagon.  Its members participate in chuckwagon cook-offs throughout the U.S.

The Academy of Western Artists presents an annual award for outstanding chuckwagon cooking, as well as honors in other fields relating to the culture of the American cowboy.

Racing

Chuckwagon racing is an event at some rodeos, mainly in Western Canada, such as the Calgary Stampede, which Kelly Sutherland won 12 times. Chuckwagon races were held from 1952 until 1998 at Cheyenne Frontier Days, one of America's biggest rodeos. There are a few professional chuckwagon racing circuits that operate in North America, with the premiere circuit being run by the World Professional Chuckwagon Association (WPCA) based in Calgary, Alberta, the Western Chuckwagon Association out of Grande Prairie, Alberta, and Canadian Professional Chuckwagon Association in Saskatchewan. A yearly chuckwagon race event is still held in Clinton, Arkansas.

Chuckwagons are raced around a figure eight barrel obstacle, and the stove and tent poles within the wagon must not be lost. The racing team also has two to four "outriders" who load the stove and tent poles at the start and must finish the race with the chuckwagon. Many such races are held each year in Western Canadian cities and towns.

Animal welfare
In 2019, six horses were killed in Alberta's Chuckwagon races at the Calgary Stampede. Animal welfare and animal rights groups have called for an end to such events.

Chuckwagon suppers

During the summer, tourists can experience chuckwagon suppers across the traditional cattle ranges of the Western United States and Western Canada, either on their own or as part of a trail ride or stay at a dude ranch. These are sometimes followed by live entertainment.

See also
 Chuckwagon racing
 Cookhouse
 Covered wagon
 Field kitchen

Notes

External links

American Chuckwagon Association
Lincoln County Cowboy Symposium

 
American frontier
Cuisine of the Western United States
Restaurants by type
Wagons
Rodeo-affiliated events

fr:Chuckwagon (chariot)